US Post Office-Lyons is a historic post office building located at Lyons in Wayne County, New York.  It was designed and built in 1931–1932 and is one of a number of post offices in New York State designed by the Office of the Supervising Architect of the Treasury Department, James A. Wetmore. It is a 1-story, five-by-six-bay, brick building with a pedimented entrance in the Colonial Revival style.

It was listed on the National Register of Historic Places in 1989.

References

Lyons
Colonial Revival architecture in New York (state)
Government buildings completed in 1931
Buildings and structures in Wayne County, New York
National Register of Historic Places in Wayne County, New York